Caulerpa articulata is a species of seaweed in the Caulerpaceae family.

Distribution 
This species is found at Three Kings Island, the North Island, and the northern parts of the South Island of New Zealand. It is also found in Western Australia.

References

articulata
Species described in 1855